The Catalina 16.5 is a series of American sailboats, that was designed by the Catalina Design Team and first built in 1994.

The boat is built by Catalina Yachts in the United States, and remained in production in 2017.

Design
The Catalina 16.5 is a small recreational sailing dinghy, built predominantly of fiberglass. It has a fractional sloop rig, a transom-hung rudder and a centerboard or fixed fin keel.

The design can accommodate up to four adults.

The boat comes equipped from the factory with hiking straps, roller furling jib, built-in flotation, a self-bailing cockpit and an anodized mast and boom.

The boat can be fitted with a small outboard motor for docking and maneuvering.

Variants
Capri 16.5
This centerboard-equipped model was introduced in 1994. It displaces  and carries no ballast.
Capri 16.5K
This fixed keel model was introduced in 1995. It displaces  and carries  of cast lead ballast.
Catalina 16.5
This centerboard-equipped model was a renamed Capri 16.5. It displaces  and carries no ballast.
Catalina 16.5K
This fixed keel model was a renamed Capri 16.5K. It displaces  and carries  of cast lead ballast.

See also
List of sailing boat types

Similar sailboats
Balboa 16
Bombardier 4.8
DS-16
Laguna 16
Laser 2
Leeward 16
Martin 16
Nordica 16
Sirocco 15
Tanzer 16

References

External links

Dinghies
1990s sailboat type designs
Sailing yachts
Sailboat type designs by Catalina Design Team
Sailboat types built by Catalina Yachts